Tectococcus ovatus (Hemiptera: Eriococcidae), also called the Brazilian Scale, is a scale insect in the family Eriococcidae. It is most widely known for being a potential biological control agent for Psidium cattleyanum (strawberry guava) in Florida, and Hawaii. Extensive testing has shown that this species is very host-specific.

References 

Eriococcidae
Endemic fauna of Hawaii